The Pakistan Civil Awards were established on March 19, 1957, following the proclamation of Pakistan as an independent republic on March 23, 1956. The announcement of civil awards is generally made once a year on Independence Day, August 14, and their investiture takes place on the following Pakistan Day, March 23. According to Article 259 of the Constitution of Pakistan 1973, along with the Decorations Act, 1975, the President of Pakistan confers civil awards on Pakistani citizens in recognition of gallantry. Awards for Pride of Performance are conferred for outstanding achievements in the fields of art, literature, science, sports and nursing.

In December, the ministries and their divisions are invited to recommend candidates to the Cabinet Division. Received nominations are considered by three awards committees after which final proposal is sent to the President for approval. After the President's approval, the announcements are made on Independence Day and investiture takes place on Pakistan Day.

The President of Pakistan can confer awards to foreign nationals any time during the year. For such awards, proposals are made by the Ministry of Foreign Affairs, and approved by the President prior to conferral.

The Civil Awards comprise five orders, each with four descending classes: Nishan (Order (Grand Cross)), Hilal (Crescent (Grand Officer)), Sitara (Star (Commander)) and Tamgha (Medal).

* Only awarded to foreign nationals.
Number in parentheses indicates order of precedence.

Recipients of the Sitara-e-Pakistan
Sitara-e-Pakistan (Star of Pakistan), stands third in hierarchy of civilian awards after the Nishan-e-Pakistan and the Hilal-e-Pakistan.

Recipients of the Tamgha-e-Pakistan
Tamgha-e-Pakistan (Medal of Pakistan), stands fourth in hierarchy of civilian awards after the Nishan-e-Pakistan, Hilal-e-Pakistan, Sitara-e-Pakistan.

References

External links
 https://web.archive.org/web/20140812211253/http://www.shaheedfoundation.org/nishanehaider.asp, Profiles of some 'Shaheeds' (martyrs) who were awarded Nishan-e-Haider Awards, Retrieved 12 February 2017

Civil awards and decorations of Pakistan
Pakistan and the Commonwealth of Nations